This is a complete list of members of the United States Senate during the 64th United States Congress listed by seniority, from March 4, 1915, to March 3, 1917.

Order of service is based on the commencement of the senator's first term. Behind this is former service as a senator (only giving the senator seniority within his or her new incoming class), service as vice president, a House member, a cabinet secretary, or a governor of a state. The final factor is the population of the senator's state.

Senators who were sworn in during the middle of the Congress (up until the last senator who was not sworn in early after winning the November 1916 election) are listed at the end of the list with no number.

Terms of service

U.S. Senate seniority list

See also
64th United States Congress
List of members of the United States House of Representatives in the 64th Congress by seniority

Notes

External links
Senate Seniority List

064